Adriana Kostiw (born 16 March 1974, in São Paulo) is a Brazilian sports sailor. At the 2012 Summer Olympics, she competed in the Women's Laser Radial class, finishing in 25th place.

References

External links
 
 
 

1974 births
Living people
Brazilian female sailors (sport)
Olympic sailors of Brazil
Sailors at the 2004 Summer Olympics – 470
Sailors at the 2012 Summer Olympics – Laser Radial
Pan American Games bronze medalists for Brazil
Pan American Games medalists in sailing
Sailors at the 2007 Pan American Games
Medalists at the 2007 Pan American Games
Sportspeople from São Paulo